is a Japanese football player. He plays for FC Ryukyu.

Career
Yukiya Tamashiro joined J3 League club FC Ryukyu in 2016.

References

External links

1993 births
Living people
International Pacific University alumni
Association football people from Okinawa Prefecture
Japanese footballers
J3 League players
FC Ryukyu players
Association football defenders